B-Rock 99.3FM (call sign: 2BXS) is a local radio station in Bathurst, New South Wales, Australia. It broadcasts on 99.3 megahertz on the FM band, from a transmitter in Bathurst, with a power output of 10 kilowatts (10,000 watts) and callsign 2BXS.

Its callsign meaning is:
 2 (a prefix for New South Wales radio stations)
 BXS, an extension of its sister station (2BS)'s callsign. However, this callsign is never heard on air.

Its on-air name, B-Rock, is named for Australian motor racing legend (and nine-time Bathurst 1000 winner) Peter Brock, but can also be known to be short for Bathurst Rock (or Rocks).

It is owned by Bathurst Broadcasters Pty. Ltd., a privately held company, owned by Bill Caralis's Broadcast Operations Group, who also owns sister station 2BS Bathurst.

It began broadcasting on 2 December 1996, as a supplementary FM license in the Bathurst district.

B-Rock's format is hot adult contemporary (rock), with a core audience of up to 39 years. Its programs are produced locally, and features competitions, comedy, requests and national news which airs on the hour from 7 am to 5 pm Monday to Friday.

See also
List of radio stations in Australia

References

External links
B-Rock FM webpage

Bathurst, New South Wales
Radio stations in New South Wales
Radio stations established in 1996
Active rock radio stations in Australia